KKOV (1550 kHz) is an AM radio station licensed to Vancouver, Washington, United States, and serving the Portland metropolitan area.  The station is owned by Intelli LLC. Studios and offices are on Southeast Lake Road in Portland and the transmitter is in the Parkway East neighborhood of Vancouver, Washington, across the Columbia River from Portland.

KKOV operates in the daytime at 50,000 watts non-directional, the highest power permitted by the Federal Communications Commission.  But because 1550 kHz is a Canadian clear channel frequency, at night, the station must reduce power to 12,000 watts and use a directional antenna pattern to protect CBEF Windsor, Ontario, the Class A station on the frequency.

Programming
KKOV broadcasts a brokered foreign language format.

History
The station first signed on the air on August 10, 1963 as "KGAR," broadcasting at 10,000 watts but signing off each evening at sunset during the 1960s.  Over the years, the station changed ownership and formats several times, and its power was boosted to 50,000 watts by day, 12,000 watts by night.  It was assigned the call sign "KKOV" by the F.C.C. on January 26, 2011.

On April 4, 2011 KKOV changed its format from adult standards to talk, branded as "Talk 1550".  On October 29, 2012 KKOV switched back to adult standards, branded as "Sunny 1550". KKOV broadcasts an adult standards format known as "America's Greatest Hits."  The format is syndicated by Westwood One.  The music was primarily adult popular hits from 1960 to the present, and artists included The Beatles, Dionne Warwick, Elton John and Frank Sinatra.  Some paid Brokered programming aired on weekends.  National news at the beginning of most hours was supplied by Westwood One News.

On April 2, 2018 KKOV changed their format from adult standards to brokered foreign language programming.

Previous Logo

References

External links

KOV
Clark County, Washington
Radio stations established in 1963
1963 establishments in Washington (state)